Anevelde is a hamlet in the Dutch province of Overijssel. It is located in the municipality Hardenberg, about 3 km northeast of the centre of Hardenberg.

It was first mentioned in 1259 as Anewede, and means "field near Ane. In 1840, it was home to 62 people. In 2017, the N34 which runs through the hamlet was doubled and all at-grade intersections were removed. The villagers have protested and demanded a tunnel, because they now have to make a  detour. A tunnel has been built.

References 

Populated places in Overijssel
Hardenberg